Lee White (born 13 September 1957) is a Bermudian sailor. He competed at the 1996 Summer Olympics, the 2000 Summer Olympics, and the 2004 Summer Olympics.

References

External links
 

1957 births
Living people
Bermudian male sailors (sport)
Olympic sailors of Bermuda
Sailors at the 1996 Summer Olympics – Star
Sailors at the 2000 Summer Olympics – Star
Sailors at the 2004 Summer Olympics – Star
Place of birth missing (living people)